What They Don't Talk About When They Talk About Love (stylized in all lowercase) is a 2013 Indonesian drama film written and directed by Mouly Surya. The film stars Nicholas Saputra, Ayushita, and Karina Salim as teenagers involved in a complex relationship while dealing with their disabilities.

Synopsis 
Diana and Fitri are two visually impaired teenage girls. Diana is myopic, meaning she can see things only an inch in front of her, while Fitri has been blind since birth. They both experience the pangs and yearnings of love, but must transcend their lack of sight to envision it. It's a struggle as they grapple to understand and fathom what they feel through other senses: touch, sound, and movement. Their missteps causing misconceptions are sometimes heartbreaking but both are gifted with a sublime resilience.

Cast 
 Nicholas Saputra as Edo
 Ayushita as Fitri
 Karina Salim as Diana
 Anggun Priambodo as Andhika
 Lupita Jennifer as Maya
 Adella Fauzi as Tiara
 Khiva Iskak as Lukman
 Tutie Kirana as Diana' mother
 Anindya Krisna as Reni
 Jajang C. Noer as Edo's mother

Production
Production of the film was funded by grants received from the Gothenburg Film Festival, Asian Project Market of the Busan International Film Festival, and Hubert Bals Fund of the International Film Festival Rotterdam.

Release
The film premiered in the World Dramatic Competition category of the 2013 Sundance Film Festival, making history as the first Indonesian film to do so. Domestically, it received limited release in May 2013. Throughout 2013, the film was screened at several prestigious film festivals, including the International Film Festival Rotterdam, Hong Kong International Film Festival, and Busan International Film Festival.

Reception

Box office 
At the time of its domestic release, the film was only shown in 14 theaters and performed poorly at the box office.

Critical response 
The film received positive reviews from critics. Writing for The Hollywood Reporter, Duane Byrge called it a "touching and brilliantly envisioned story of a young, nearly blind teen's first love" and singled out Zeke Khaseli's score for highlighting "the character’s emotional struggles." Fransisca Bianca of the Whiteboard Journal wrote "the film truly explores things that are not talked when we talk about love" while praising the film for "its bravery in introducing a new form of romance through its cinematography and unique love story."

Awards and nominations

References

External links
 
 

2013 films
2013 drama films
2010s Indonesian-language films
Films about deaf people
Films about disability
Films about blind people
2010s coming-of-age drama films
Indonesian coming-of-age drama films